The Kaohsiung Municipal Hsin-Chuang Senior High School (HCHS) is a senior high school located in Zuoying district of Kaohsiung City, Taiwan. Established in 1995, it serves as a public high school mostly for the students in northern Kaohsiung. The current principal is Wen-Zong Xu.

Transportation
The school is accessible within walking distance south east of Xinzuoying Station of Taiwan Railways Administration.

See also
 Education in Taiwan

External links
 Official Website

High schools in Taiwan
1995 establishments in Taiwan
Educational institutions established in 1995